The first season of Ellen, an American television series, began March 29, 1994 and ended on August 30, 1994. It originally aired on ABC as These Friends of Mine. The region 1 DVD was released on September 28, 2004. Two episodes that were meant to be a part of Season One, "The Tape" and "The Mugging", and aired near the end of Season Three, are included on the Season One DVD set.

Cast

Main cast
 Ellen DeGeneres as Ellen Morgan
 Holly Fulger as Holly
 Arye Gross as Adam Green
 David Anthony Higgins as Joe Farrell
 Clea Lewis as Audrey Penney
 Maggie Wheeler as Anita Warrell
 Cristine Rose as Susan

Episodes

References

1994 American television seasons
Ellen (TV series) seasons